Jonathan Eysseric and Quentin Halys were the defending champions but chose not to defend their title.

Sander Arends and David Pel won the title after defeating Purav Raja and Divij Sharan 6–7(1–7), 7–6(8–6), [10–6] in the final.

Seeds

Draw

References

External links
 Main draw

Internationaux de Tennis de Vendée - Doubles
2022 Doubles